The following are the list of awards and nominations received by the South Korean girl group Miss A,The group gathered 20 awards over 64 nominations.


Awards and nominations

Listicles

Notes

References

Miss A
Awards